John Casimir Zichy Woinarski is an Australian ornithologist, mammalogist, and herpetologist.  He was awarded the 2001 Eureka Prize for Biodiversity Research.  In the same year he was the recipient of the D. L. Serventy Medal, awarded by the Royal Australasian Ornithologists Union for outstanding published work on birds in the Australasian region.

Dr. Woinarski is currently Professor in the Research Institute for the Environment and Livelihoods, a part-time position at Charles Darwin University, in Darwin, Northern Territory. Much of his work has been focused on the conservation of threatened species and he has extensively published work on the responses of biodiversity to fire. He is a co-author of The Action Plan for Australian Mammals 2012.

In February 2019, speaking about the confirmed extinction of the Bramble Cay melomys, considered the only mammal endemic to the Great Barrier Reef and the first documented extinction of a mammal species due to climate change, he said that its loss was foreseeable and preventable. It had been known for years that its position was precarious, and he believed that its loss is at least partly due to under-funding for conservation programs and the fact that it was not an animal charismatic enough to garner much public attention.

After the 2019–20 Australian bushfire season Dr. Woinarski became a member of the Australian Commonwealth’s Wildlife and threatened species bushfire recovery Expert Panel.

In May 2020 the Federal Court of Australia accepted Dr. Woinarski's contributed expert opinion for the protection of some important forests in South Eastern Australia, being the threatened natural habitat of Australia's iconic Greater Glider and the Leadbeater’s Possum.

References

Sources

Brooker, Michael; & Ridpath, Michael. (2001). D.L. Serventy Medal 2001: Citation. John C.Z. Woinarski. Emu 101: 272.
Robin, Libby. (2001). The Flight of the Emu: a hundred years of Australian ornithology 1901-2001. Carlton, Vic. Melbourne University Press.

Selected bibliography

Books
Cats in Australia: Companion and Killer. Woinarski, J., Legge, S., Dickman, C. (CSIRO Publishing, 2019) 
A Bat's End: The Christmas Island Pipistrelle and Extinction in Australia. Woinarski, J. (CSIRO Publishing, 2018) 
’’Recovering Australian Threatened Species - A book of hope.’’ Garnett, S., Latch, P., Lindenmayer, D., Woinarski, J. (CSIRO Publishing, 2018) 

Year of birth missing (living people)
Living people
Australian ornithologists
Zichy family